Olegius is a genus of ground beetles in the family Carabidae. This genus has a single species, Olegius turkmenicus. It is found in Turkmenistan.

References

Trechinae